Canton is an unincorporated community in Washington Township, Washington County, in the U.S. state of Indiana.

History
Canton was laid out and platted in 1838. Old variant names of the community were Greensburg and Eggharbor.

A post office was established at Canton in 1835, and remained in operation until it was discontinued in 1905.

Geography

References

Unincorporated communities in Indiana
Unincorporated communities in Washington County, Indiana
Populated places established in 1838
1838 establishments in Indiana